Chaudhry Mohsin Ashraf is a Pakistani politician who was a Member of the Provincial Assembly of the Punjab, from December 2012 to May 2018.

Early life 
He was born on 29 October 1978.

Political career
He was elected to the Provincial Assembly of the Punjab as a candidate of Pakistan Muslim League (N) (PML-N) from Constituency PP-129 (Sialkot-IX) in by-polls held in December 2012. He received 52,195 votes and defeated a candidate of Pakistan Muslim League (Q).

He was re-elected to the Provincial Assembly of the Punjab as a candidate of PML-N from Constituency PP-129 (Sialkot-IX) in 2013 Pakistani general election. He received 63,257 votes and defeated Fiaz Iqbal Cheema, a candidate of Pakistan Tehreek-e-Insaf (PTI).

References

Living people
Punjab MPAs 2013–2018
1978 births
Pakistan Muslim League (N) politicians
Punjab MPAs 2008–2013